
Year 372 (CCCLXXII) was a leap year starting on Sunday (link will display the full calendar) of the Julian calendar. At the time, it was known as the Year of the Consulship of Modestus and Arintheus (or, less frequently, year 1125 Ab urbe condita). The denomination 372 for this year has been used since the early medieval period, when the Anno Domini calendar era became the prevalent method in Europe for naming years.

Events 
 By place 

 Roman Empire 
 Emperor Valentinian I is engaged in operations against the Alamanni, Quadi and  Sarmatians, while his subordinates are dealing with Firmus,  Roman usurper, in Africa and the Picts in Britain.

 Europe 
 The Huns attack the Tervingi on the Dniester, overwhelming them with light cavalry (horse archers), and devastating the settlements of the Goths. King Athanaric is defeated, and seeks refuge in the Carpathian Mountains (Romania).
 Athanaric starts building new defensive works, to protect his people against the Alans and the Huns.

 China 
 Sixteen Kingdoms: Jin Feidi is dethroned as emperor of the Eastern Jin Dynasty. He is replaced by his granduncle Sima Yu, who is installed as  Jin Jianwendi.
 September 12 – Jin Xiaowudi, age 10, succeeds his father Jin Jianwendi. Empress Chu Suanzi serves as regent, but decisions are made by the high officials Xie An and Wang Tanzhi.
 The first diplomatic ties are established between the Korean kingdom of Baekje and the Chinese court of the Jin Dynasty.

 By topic 

 Art and Science 
 The national academy of Chinese learning, called Taehak, is established in the kingdom of Goguryeo (Korea).

 Religion 
 Gregory of Nyssa becomes bishop.
 Buddhism is adopted as the official religion of Gorguryeo.
 Saint Augustine adopts Manichaeism.
 Valentinian I bans Manichaean meetings.

Births 
 Pei Songzhi, Chinese historian and politician (d. 451)

Deaths 
 Jianwen of Jin, Chinese emperor of the Jin Dynasty (b. 320)
 Maximus of Ephesus, Greek Neoplatonist philosopher
 Sabbas the Goth, Christian reader and saint (b. 334)

References